The Salmonberry River is a tributary of the Nehalem River, about  long, in northwest Oregon in the United States. The river runs through part of the region devastated between 1933 and 1951 by a series of wildfires known as the Tillamook Burn.

The river's name comes from the salmonberry plant, Rubus spectabilis.

Railroad
An excursion railway and dinner train, the Oregon Coast Scenic Railroad (OCSR), travels up the Nehalem River canyon from Wheeler to the mouth of the Salmonberry. The train to the Salmonberry is part of an excursion-train network operated by the OCSR, a non-profit organization run by volunteers, on track formerly used by the Southern Pacific Railroad and the Port of Tillamook Bay Railroad.

The Wild Salmon Center and other conservation groups concerned about salmon and steelhead runs on the Nehalem and the Salmonberry prefer that the track along the Salmonberry remain closed. Of particular concern are landslides and herbicide spraying along the railway tracks in the river's riparian zones. Both kinds of incursion can harm fish and incubating fish eggs.

See also 
 List of rivers of Oregon

References

Rivers of Oregon
Rivers of Washington County, Oregon
Rivers of Tillamook County, Oregon
Tillamook Burn